Saeb Mohebi (born 28 August 1993) is an Iranian footballer who currently plays as a defender for Rah Ahan in the Azadegan League.

Club career

Caspian Qazvin
Mohebi was part of Caspian Qazvin from club establishment date in 2012 to 2014.

Zob Ahan
He joined Zob Ahan in summer 2014 with a 3 years contract. He made his debut for Zob Ahan in fixture 4 of 2014–15 Iran Pro League against Rah Ahan as a substitute for Sina Ashouri.

Club career statistics

International career

U23
He was invited to Iran U-23 training camp by Nelo Vingada to preparation for Incheon 2014 and 2016 AFC U-22 Championship (Summer Olympic qualification).

Honours

Club
Zob Ahan
Hazfi Cup (2): 2014–15, 2015–16
Iranian Super Cup (1): 2016

References

External links 
 Saeb Mohebi at IranLeague.i
 Saeb Mohebi at PersianLeague.com

1993 births
Living people
Zob Ahan Esfahan F.C. players
Iranian footballers
People from Rudbar
Association football defenders
Sportspeople from Gilan province